The Chairperson of the Organisation of African Unity served as the head of the Organisation of African Unity, a rotating position.

List

See also
 Chairperson of the African Union

References